Charles Moss Woolf (10 July 187931 December 1942) was a British film distributor.

Biography
Woolf made a fortune by financing, distributing and exhibiting films after World War I, including some of Alfred Hitchcock's first films. In 1935 he resigned from the Gaumont British Picture Corporation and formed General Film Distributors. He brought J. Arthur Rank into the film industry.

He was the father of producers John and James Woolf, and of Rosemary Woolf, a scholar of medieval literature.

Selected filmography
 The Lodger: A Story of the London Fog (1927)
 The Vortex (1927)
 Easy Virtue (1928)
 The First Born (1928)
 The Return of the Rat (1929)
 No Monkey Business (1935)
 When Knights Were Bold (1936)

References

External links

British film producers
1879 births
1942 deaths